Ermal Fejzullahu (born 23 August 1988 in Pristina) is a Kosovo-Albanian singer.

Early life
Ermal Fejzullahu was born on 23 August 1988 in Pristina, Kosovo. He is the son of well-known Albanian singer Sabri Fejzullahu.

Career
In the summer of 2010 Fejzullahu had a song collaboration with Tingulli 3nt, a famous Albanian rapper group. The video of the song was reportedly censored, because of the excessive nudity exposed in the images.

He was the winner of Top Fest edition of 2015.

Personal life
He is married to Ariana Fejzullahu and together they have four children named Art, Buna, Era and Ana.

References

External links
Ermal Fejzullahu along Sinan Hoxha singing Hajredin Pasha, the Ottoman Army general who tried to stop the Albanian Revolt of 1843–1844

1988 births
Living people
21st-century Albanian male singers
Kosovo Albanians
Place of birth missing (living people)
Musicians from Pristina